Mark van den Boogaart (born 3 September 1985) is a Dutch footballer who plays for Amsterdamsche FC as a midfielder.

Club career
A native of Rotterdam, van den Boogaart started playing at local giants Feyenoord, spending the following two years with Sevilla FC's reserves in the third division, with the Spaniards in turn loaning him back to his country with FC Dordrecht in the summer of 2006.

In the 2007–08 season, van den Boogaart finally made his Eredivisie debuts, with NEC Nijmegen, but he only played two league games in two years as he was seriously injured. Released in May 2009, he returned to Spain and signed for Real Murcia, failing to appear in any competitive matches.

Afterwards, van den Boogaart returned to his homeland and played in the newly created Topklasse, first spending two seasons with BVV Barendrecht then joining Rijnsburgse Boys in 2012. In the 2015 January transfer window, he moved to Amsterdamsche FC.

References

External links
Stats at Voetbal International 

1985 births
Living people
Footballers from Rotterdam
Dutch footballers
Association football midfielders
Eredivisie players
Eerste Divisie players
Derde Divisie players
Feyenoord players
FC Dordrecht players
NEC Nijmegen players
BVV Barendrecht players
Rijnsburgse Boys players
Amsterdamsche FC players
Segunda División B players
Sevilla Atlético players
Real Murcia players
Dutch expatriate footballers
Expatriate footballers in Spain
Dutch expatriate sportspeople in Spain